Ormond Square is a square on the northside of Dublin city.

History
Ormond Square sits on the site of the former Ormond Market. Along with Ormond Quay, the square is named after James Butler, 1st Duke of Ormond. Ormond Market appears on maps of Dublin in 1684, and was built on an area formerly known as The Pill. The Pill was a small river inlet which branched off the River Liffey at the estuary of the River Bradogue and the area around it, and formed part of the land granted to St Mary's Abbey. The inlet was later removed when the River Liffey was confined by the Quay walls and the land was reclaimed.

Ormond market
The public market building was built by Sir Humphrey Jervis. It consisted of an open central rotunda with 70 stalls. When the new city markets where built on Mary's Lane, the Ormond Market was demolished in 1890 and public housing was later built on the site. It was then renamed Ormond Square.

Notable residents 

 Johnny Giles former association football player and manager lived in 7A Ormond Square

References

Squares in Dublin (city)